Grim Reality may refer to:

Grim Reality (EP), an EP by Macabre
Grim Reality (album), an album by Insane Poetry